Cheremshanka is a rural locality (a selo) and the administrative center of Cheremshansky Selsoviet of Yeltsovsky District, Altai Krai, Russia. The population was 305 as of 2016. There are  5 streets.

Geography 
Cheremshanka is located on the right bank of the Chumysh River, 16 km southwest of Yeltsovka (the district's administrative centre) by road. Yeltsovka is the nearest rural locality.

Ethnicity 
The village is inhabited by Russians and others.

References 

Rural localities in Yeltsovsky District